Taras Mykolaiovych Stepanenko (born 8 August 1989) is a Ukrainian professional footballer who plays as a defensive midfielder for Shakhtar Donetsk and the Ukraine national team. He started his career at Metalurh Zaporizhzhia, making his debut in 2007, before joining Shakhtar in 2010.

Club career

Metalurh Zaporizhzhia
Taras began his career with Metalurh Zaporizhzhia, playing for the junior team 16 times, scoring 1 goal, in the 2006–07 season, before being promoted to the senior team for the rest of the season.

He made his debut for the senior team on 4 March 2007 at the age of 17 in a 3–1 defeat to Dynamo Kyiv. He ended his first season in the senior side with 12 appearances.

In his second season he scored his first goal for the club on 21 July 2007 in a 1–0 Premier League victory over Kryvbas. He was just one month shy of his 18th birthday when he netted the goal. He went on to make 23 appearances for the club in that season, with 1 goal.

His third season saw him become an integral part of the team as he made 29 appearances for the club.

The following season he played 17 matches for the club. At the end of the season he agreed a deal to join reigning Premier League champions Shakhtar Donetsk. He made a total of 81 appearances for Metalurh's first team, scoring 1 goal.

Shakhtar Donetsk

2010–11
On 11 May 2010 the midfielder signed a five-year deal with Shakhtar Donetsk for an undisclosed, leaving Metalurh Zaporizhzhia with Serhiy Kryvtsov who also joined Shakhtar in a five-year deal. He made his debut for the club in a 7–1 Super Cup victory over Tavriya Simferopol, coming on as a substitute. This was his first trophy with the club. He scored his first goal for the club on 23 November 2010 in a 3–0 Champions League group stage victory over Partizan Belgrade. He made 20 appearances for Shakhtar in his first season, including 15 league appearances, scoring 1 goal. He helped Shakhtar to a treble, winning the Premier League, Super Cup and the Cup.

2011–12
In his second season with the club he made 12 appearances, 9 in the league and 3 in the cup. He came on in the 109th minute of Shakhtar's 2–1 extra time victory over Metalurh Donetsk in the Ukrainian Cup Final. Shakhtar also secured another Premier League title.

2012–13
He played the full 90 minutes of Shakhtar's 2–0 Super Cup victory over Metalurh Donetsk, picking up a yellow card in the 60th minute. On 6 August 2012, he assisted Henrikh Mkhitaryan for the second goal in a 4–0 Premier League victory over Volyn Lutsk. He assisted Oleksandr Kucher for the first goal in a 3–1 victory over FC Dynamo Kyiv on 2 September. On 28 September he picked up a red card in the 89th minute after receiving a second yellow card in a match against Dnipro Dnipropetrovsk, however it did not affect Shakhtar as they won the match 2–1. On 19 October he assisted Dmytro Chyhrynskyi for the winning goal in a 2–1 victory against Illichivets Mariupol.

Rivalry with Yarmolenko
In a match in October 2015 Andriy Yarmolenko committed a dangerous challenge which almost broke Stepanenko's leg. The two made up after the game and exchanged jerseys, but afterwards Yarmolenko threw Stepanenko's shirt on the ground while he thanked the Dynamo Kyiv fans. In the Shakhtar-Dynamo derby in April 2016 after the former won 3–0 Stepanenko went in front of the Dynamo fans kissing his badge. In a brawl that escalated Yarmolenko kicked and beat Stepanenko to the ground. After the brawl, three red cards were shown; a straight red card to Yarmolenko and Oleksandr Kucher, and a second yellow to Stepanenko.

International career

He was the captain of Ukraine national under-21 football team. He has appeared for Ukraine's under-19 team four times, the under-21 team on 22 occasions, scoring one goal, and the senior team five times.
On 17 November 2010, he made his debut for the senior side in the 2:2 draw with Switzerland in a friendly match, coming on as a 65th-minute substitute for Taras Mykhalyk. His first start came on 8 February 2011 in a 2–2 draw against Romania. He made another appearance the following day in a 1–1 draw with Sweden. He played in a 2–0 defeat to Italy on 29 March 2011. On 15 August 2012, he came on as a 72nd-minute substitute for Shakhtar Donetsk teammate Marko Dević in a 0–0 draw with Czech Republic. On 26 March 2013, Stepanenko received red card for high kick on Vitaliy Bordiyan in a World Cup qualification match against Moldova.

Stepanenko was included in Ukraine's squad for the UEFA Euro 2016, making three appearances as Ukraine finished bottom of the group with no points.

Personal life
Taras Stepanenko spoke against the tattoo culture among football players and cited his Christian beliefs as the reason. He is also an avid reader, his favourite genre being biographies of great men.

Career statistics

Club

International

Scores and results list Ukraine's goal tally first, score column indicates score after each Stepanenko goal.

Honours
Shakhtar Donetsk
 Ukrainian Premier League (8): 2010–11, 2011–12, 2012–13, 2013–14, 2016–17, 2017–18, 2018–19, 2019–20
 Ukrainian Cup (7): 2010–11, 2011–12, 2012–13, 2015–16, 2016–17, 2017–18, 2018–19
 Ukrainian Super Cup (7): 2010, 2012, 2013, 2014, 2015, 2017, 2021

References

External links
 
 
 Ukrainian Premier League statistics

1989 births
Living people
People from Donetsk Oblast
Ukrainian footballers
Ukraine under-21 international footballers
Ukraine youth international footballers
Ukraine international footballers
Ukrainian Premier League players
Ukrainian Second League players
FC Metalurh Zaporizhzhia players
FC Metalurh-2 Zaporizhzhia players
FC Shakhtar Donetsk players
Ukrainian Christians
Association football midfielders
UEFA Euro 2016 players
UEFA Euro 2020 players
Sportspeople from Donetsk Oblast